Lawrence Mohr may refer to:

 Lawrence B. Mohr (born 1931), American political scientist
 Lawrence C. Mohr, Jr., physician to the presidents Ronald Reagan, George H. W. Bush, and briefly Bill Clinton